The Coalition of Democrats (CODE) are an opposition faction within Zimbabwe which was formed on the 9 August 2017. The group endorsed Elton Mangoma as their presidential candidate in the 2018 General Election. The group is currently led by Mangoma following the Zimbabwe African People's Union's split from the bloc and Dumiso Dabengwa's subsequent resignation as the Chair of the group's Supreme Council on 18 April 2018.

Coalition partners
CODE is a group made up of eight political parties which include:
Renewal Democrats of Zimbabwe (RDZ)
Progressive Democrats of Zimbabwe
Zimbabweans United for Democracy
Democratic Assembly for Restoration and Empowerment
African Democratic Party
Mavambo/Kusile/Dawn
ZimFirst

Former partners
On 18 April 2018, the Zimbabwe African People's Union (ZAPU) split from the bloc. ZAPU's then party leader Dumiso Dabengwa cited his party's irreconcilable differences with CODE over the former's ideology relating to national liberation.

Ideology
The Coalition of Democrats officially follows three ideologies: Pan-Africanism, Social Democracy and Modern Nationalism. It actively endorses the African Union's vision 2063.

Modern nationalism
CODE defines modern nationalism as using and exploiting Zimbabwe's national resources to benefit all of the population. The coalition wishes to fulfil the aspirations of the Founding Zimbabwean Nationalists by ensuring that all Zimbabweans are treated equally.

References

External links

2017 establishments in Zimbabwe
African and Black nationalist parties in Africa
Nationalist parties in Africa
Pan-Africanism in Zimbabwe
Pan-Africanist political parties in Africa
Political parties established in 2017
Political party alliances in Zimbabwe
Social democratic parties in Africa
Zimbabwe African People's Union